Richard Bladworth Hawkey (7 August 1923 – 19 March 1991) was an English first-class cricketer and squash player.

Born at Teddington, Hawkey was educated at Merchant Taylors' School. Going up to the University of Cambridge, Hawkey made his debut in first-class cricket for the Free Foresters against Cambridge University in 1948. The following year he played two first-class matches for Cambridge University against the touring New Zealanders and Warwickshire, both played at Fenner's. He scored 42 runs and took a single wicket across his three first-class matches. Besides playing cricket, he was also an international squash player, representing England. He also wrote a number of coaching books on the subject. He died at Hillingdon in March 1991.

References

External links

1923 births
1991 deaths
People from Teddington
People educated at Merchant Taylors' School, Northwood
Alumni of the University of Cambridge
English cricketers
Free Foresters cricketers
Cambridge University cricketers
English male squash players
English non-fiction writers